Podelmis ovalis, is a species of riffle beetle found in Sri Lanka.

References 

Elmidae
Insects of Sri Lanka
Insects described in 1982